Ethnikos Neo Agioneri F.C. is a Greek football club, based in Neo Agioneri, Kilkis.

The club was founded in 1973. They will play for 3rd year in Gamma Ethniki for the season 2015-16.

External links
 Official website

Football clubs in Central Macedonia
Association football clubs established in 1973
1973 establishments in Greece